St. Joseph's School, Darjeeling, popularly called North Point or N.P. (as it serves as a landmark for the North Point locality in Darjeeling), is a private Catholic primary and secondary school for boys located in Darjeeling, West Bengal, India. Originally called St. Joseph's College, the school was founded in the year 1888 and is owned and managed by the Jesuits.

History
St. Joseph's School, Darjeeling was founded by Fr. Henri Depelchin on 13 February 1888, at Sunnybank, Darjeeling with 25 students on the rolls. It was shifted to its present location in 1892. North Point celebrated its 125th year anniversary on 10th November, 2013 which was graced by the presence of the then President of India, Shri Pranab Mukherjee.

School system
The school is divided into four divisions:
 Primary DivisionClasses 3 to 5
 Lower DivisionClasses 6 and 7
 Upper DivisionClasses 8 to 10
 Senior DivisionClasses 11 and 12

The Primary division has eight captains, the lower division has eight head boys, the upper division has eight prefects, the senior division has eight beadles. The student fraternity is led by the School Captain and the School Vice-Captain. These are the student representatives and leaders of the school from both the boarding and day scholar sections of the school, appointed on leadership, academic, and sportsmanship abilities. Also all the classes in the school have two monitors, one from the boarding section and other one from day scholar section.

The school provides facilities for various games such as cricket, football, basketball, volleyball, table tennis, chess; and also engages in co-curricular activities such as quiz, debate, music and drama. Over the years of its long history, the school has developed a competitive rivalry in Inter-School Tournaments with the other Anglo-Indian schools of Darjeeling and Kalimpong, particularly St. Paul's School, Darjeeling, and St. Augustine's School, Kalimpong.

House system 
The school has four houses:

Depelchin House (Red)
Fallon House (Blue)
Laenen House (Yellow)
O'Neil House (Green)

Publications
The school has a number of publications, which include the North Point Weekly, the Among Ourselves (monthly), and the North Point Annual (yearly), all compiled and edited by the students' Editorial Board.

School rankings
In 2020, St. Joseph's School, North Point ranked second among boarding schools in Darjeeling and West Bengal and, in 2021, eleventh in India according to the Education-World India School Rankings. The school has consistently been regarded as among the most prestigious boarding schools in India.

Notable alumni
 Erick AvariHollywood actor
 E J AnthonyFounding member of Group Analytic Society and child Psychiatrist 
 Birendra Bir Bikram Shah Devformer King of Nepal 
 Gyanendra Bir Bikram Shah Devformer King of Nepal 
 Paras Bir Bikram Shah Devformer Crown Prince of Nepal 
 Lawrence Durrellpoet and novelist 
 Michael Ferreiraworld billiard champion 
 Jamyang NorbuTibetan activist and author 
 Cardinal Lawrence T. PicachyArchbishop of Calcutta
 Kasit Piromyaformer Foreign Minister of Thailand
 Tsoltim Ngima Shakabpainternational banker, activist, writer and poet
 Jigme Singye Wangchuckformer King of Bhutan 
 Yeshey Zimbaformer Prime Minister of Bhutan
 Brian Hayes - Australian QC and co-producer of the movie "Hotel Mumbai"
 Jeremy Bujakowski - Polish–Indian alpine skier

See also

 List of Jesuit schools
 List of schools in West Bengal

References

External links

 School Website

Jesuit primary schools in India
Boys' schools in India
Catholic boarding schools in India
Christian schools in West Bengal
Boarding schools in West Bengal
Schools in Darjeeling district
Jesuit secondary schools in India
Educational institutions established in 1888
1888 establishments in India